Rhenium(VII) oxide is the inorganic compound with the formula Re2O7.  This yellowish solid is the anhydride of HOReO3. Perrhenic acid, Re2O7·2H2O, is closely related to Re2O7.  Re2O7 is the raw material for all rhenium compounds, being the volatile fraction obtained upon roasting the host ore.

Structure
Solid Re2O7 consists of alternating octahedral and tetrahedral Re centres.  Upon heating, the polymer cracks to give molecular (nonpolymeric) Re2O7.  This molecular species closely resembles manganese heptoxide, consisting of a pair of ReO4 tetrahedra that share a vertex, i.e., O3Re–O–ReO3.

Synthesis and reactions

Re2O7 dissolves in water to give perrhenic acid.  

Heating Re2O7 gives rhenium dioxide, a reaction signalled by the appearance of the dark blue coloration:
2Re2O7  →  4ReO2  +  3O2

Using tetramethyltin, it converts to methylrhenium trioxide ("MTO"), a catalyst for oxidations:
Re2O7  +  2Sn(CH3)4  → CH3ReO3  +  (CH3)3SnOReO3

In a related reaction, it reacts with hexamethyldisiloxane to give the siloxide:
Re2O7  +  2O(Si(CH3)3)2  → 2(CH3)3SiOReO3

Uses

Hydrogenation catalyst
Rhenium(VII) oxide finds some use in organic synthesis as a catalyst for ethenolysis, carbonyl reduction and amide reduction.

References

Rhenium compounds
Acidic oxides
Hydrogenation catalysts